Radermachera xylocarpa is a species of plant in the family Bignoniaceae. It is endemic to India. Radermachera xylocarpa is reported to contain steroidal compounds like stegmasterol, sitosterol, cholesterol etc. with higher concentrations in different part of the plant.

References

External links
 flowers of india खडशिंगी
 Pharmacographia indica. A history of the principal drugs of vegetable origin
Investigations on Secondary Metabolites in Different Parts of Radermachera xylocarpa Using GC-MS. Journal of Pharmacognosy and Phytochemistry. 2(6): 39–47.

xylocarpa